Native Americans or Native American may refer to:

Ethnic groups
 Indigenous peoples of the Americas, the pre-Columbian peoples of North and South America and their descendants
 Native Americans in the United States
 Indigenous peoples in Canada 
 First Nations in Canada, Canadian indigenous peoples neither Inuit nor Métis
 Inuit, an indigenous people of the mainland and insular Bering Strait, northern coast, Labrador, Greenland, and Canadian Arctic Archipelago regions
 Métis in Canada, peoples of Canada originating from both indigenous (First Nations or Inuit) and European ancestry
 Indigenous peoples of Costa Rica
 Indigenous peoples of Mexico
 Indigenous peoples of South America
 Indigenous peoples in Argentina
 Indigenous peoples in Bolivia
 Indigenous peoples in Brazil
 Indigenous peoples in Chile
 Indigenous peoples in Colombia
 Indigenous peoples in Ecuador
 Indigenous peoples in Peru
 Indigenous peoples in Suriname
 Indigenous peoples in Venezuela

Arts and culture
 Native American (album), a 1992 album by Tony Rice
 The Native Americans, a 1994 American documentary series
 "Native Americans", a 1972 composition by Ornette Coleman from Skies of America
 "Native American", a 1987 song by Little Steven from Freedom – No Compromise
 Native American, or Sons of Beaches, a 1995 album by The Bellamy Brothers

Politics
 The "Native American" movement, a term for nativism in the United States
 Native American Party, or Know Nothing, an American nativist political party of the 1850s

Religions
 Native American religions

See also
 Native American name controversy
 Native American languages, languages spoken by indigenous peoples of the Americas
American Indians (disambiguation)
First Nations (disambiguation)
 Indian (disambiguation)

Indigenous peoples of the Americas